General Dawson

Bertrand Dawson, 1st Viscount Dawson of Penn (1864–1945), Royal Army Medical Corps major general
Brian Dawson (general) (born 1954), Australian Army major general
Donald Dawson (1908–2005), U.S. Air Force Reserve major general
Douglas Dawson (1854–1933), British Army brigadier general
Richard Dawson (British Army officer) (died c. 1800), British Army lieutenant general
Vesey John Dawson (1853–1930), British Army major general